Nguyễn Mạnh Khải, known as Nguyễn Khải (3 December 1930 – 15 January 2008) was a Vietnamese author. Khải substantially rewrote and re-issued one of his early works, Cái Thời Lãng Mạn (Romantic Time 1987) as Tầm Nhìn Xa (Far Vision) after changing his mind about the views of small landholders.

Works
 translated Past Continuous by Khải Nguyễn, Thanh Hao Phan, and Wayne Karlin 2001

References

Vietnamese writers
1930 births
2008 deaths